David Antonius Hanssen (born 13 November 1976) is a Norwegian former professional footballer who played as a midfielder. He is currently player-manager at Lommedalen. Hanssen has previously played for Lillehammer FK, Faaberg, Stabæk, Strømsgodset, Vålerenga, Start, Hønefoss and Stabæk for a second time.

Early life
He grew up in Reinøya near Tromsø, then moved to Follebu at the age of nine and Lillehammer three years later. His parents were Pentecostals.

Club career
David Hanssen played at Stabæk for 4 seasons. He was later purchased by Strømsgodset, later by Vålerenga ahead of the 2002 season. He had a good spell, but injuries to his knee put his career at Vålerenga on hold. After one season in Start, he played five season for Hønefoss.

In 2012, Hanssen returned to his former club Stabæk. He made his re-debut for Stabæk on the opening day of the Norwegian Premier League season against Aalesund on 24 March 2012.

After the season, Hanssen decided to step down from professional football and joined the Third Division Lommedalen as player-manager, with Marcus Bakke as playing assistant.

References

1976 births
Living people
Sportspeople from Lillehammer
Norwegian footballers
Stabæk Fotball players
Strømsgodset Toppfotball players
Vålerenga Fotball players
IK Start players
Hønefoss BK players
Norwegian football managers
Sportspeople from Tromsø

Association football midfielders